Expedition 39 was the 39th expedition to the International Space Station. It marked the first time the ISS had been under command of a Japanese astronaut, space veteran Koichi Wakata. After Expedition 21 in 2009 and Expedition 35 in 2013, it was only the third time an ISS crew was led by neither a NASA nor an RSA crew member.

During Expedition 39, Astronauts Mastracchio and Swanson installed the "Veggie" project on the International Space Station.

Crew

Source JAXA, NASA, ESA

References

External links

NASA's Space Station Expeditions page

Expeditions to the International Space Station
2014 in spaceflight